The 2009 National Rugby League season consisted of 26 weekly regular season rounds, starting on 13 March and ending on 6 September, followed by four weeks of play-offs which culminated in the grand final on 4 October.

Regular season

Round 1
Steve Price (New Zealand Warriors) played his 300th game in top grade rugby league in Australia.
Hazem El Masri (Bulldogs) overtook Andrew Johns as the highest-scoring player in top grade rugby league in Australia.
 The Rabbitohs scored 50 or more for the first time since Round 17 1992 ending a 332-game drought, it was also the highest Round 1 score since 2002.
 Golden Point was used for the first time in the Dragons-Melbourne game with a Greg Inglis field goal proving the difference.

Round 2
The Bulldogs had their two competition points stripped as they breached NRL match rules by fielding 14 players during the scoring of the match-winning try.

Round 3

Round 4

Round 5

Round 6
 Golden Point was used again in the Warriors-Roosters game, with a Stacey Jones field goal proving the difference.

Round 7

Round 8
Darren Lockyer (Brisbane Broncos) played his 300th game in top grade rugby league in Australia.

Round 9
 2 representative matches were played during this round, City vs Country Origin and the Australia vs New Zealand test match.

Round 10: Heritage Round

Round 11

Round 12

Round 13

Round 14

Round 15

Round 16

Round 17

Round 18

Round 19

Parramatta forward Nathan Hindmarsh played his 250th First Grade game for the club.

Round 20

Round 21
Matt Bowen becomes the first North Queensland Cowboys player to score 100 tries for the club.

Round 22

Round 23

Round 24

Round 25

Round 26
Channel Nine had its biggest Friday night TV ratings of the year for the Eels-Dragons game with the audience peaking at 580,000.

Finals series

Qualifying finals

Semi finals

Preliminary finals

Grand final

Again, a Finals match up between the 2 clubs provided controversy. With just under 10 minutes remaining the Melbourne Storm fullback, Billy Slater was bringing the ball off his own line. Whilst playing the ball he appeared to drop the ball. However, referees Archer and Hayne gave a penalty saying that Parramatta fullback Jarryd Hayne had knocked the ball out of Slater's hand. From the subsequent penalty Storm centre Greg Inglis kicked a field goal to prevent a Parramatta comeback. In 2010 it was found that the Melbourne Storm had cheated the salary cap and as a result both this Premiership and the 2007 Premiership were wiped from the club as well as the 3 Minor Premierships it had gained and the World Club Challenge.

References

Results
National Rugby League season results